Lok Wah North is one of the 37 constituencies in the Kwun Tong District of Hong Kong which was created in 1991.

The constituency loosely covers part of Lok Wah Estate with the estimated population of 12,479.

Councillors represented

Election results

2010s

2000s

1990s

References

Constituencies of Hong Kong
Constituencies of Kwun Tong District Council
1991 establishments in Hong Kong
Constituencies established in 1991
Ngau Tau Kok